Eurobarometer is a series of public opinion surveys conducted regularly on behalf of the European Commission and other EU institutions since 1973. These surveys address a wide variety of topical issues relating to the European Union throughout its member states.

The Eurobarometer results are published by the European Commission's Directorate-General Communication. Its database since 1973 is one of the largest in the world.

Forerunners of Eurobarometer
In 1970 and 1971, the European Commission conducted surveys in the six member countries (at that time) of the European Community (Belgium, France, West Germany, Italy, Luxembourg and the Netherlands). These surveys assessed public opinion on individual national priorities as well as integrated European functions and organisations, including the Common Market (European Economic Community).

Regular semi-annual polls of member nations – now also including Denmark, Ireland and the United Kingdom – began in September 1973, with the survey series first being given the name Eurobarometer in 1974. The fieldwork for Euro-Barometer 1 was conducted in April–May of that year, with results published in July.

A first international survey on attitudes towards European unification ("Attitudes towards Europe") was carried out in 1962 at the request of the Press and Information Service of the European Communities in (Belgium, France, West Germany, Italy, Luxembourg and the Netherlands).

Standard Eurobarometer survey 
The Standard Eurobarometer survey series is a cross-national longitudinal study, designed to compare and gauge trends within Member States of the European Union.

This survey is carried out each autumn and spring. Although the range of questions has been expanded over the years, the programme aims to keep most of the survey constant, so that data is comparable over time. Starting with Eurobarometer 34 (1990), separate supplementary surveys on special topics have been conducted under almost every Eurobarometer wave. Special irregularly repeated modules investigate topics such as agriculture, biotechnology, consumer behaviour, elderly people, energy, environment, family, gender issues, health, immigration, poverty, regional identity, science and technology, urban traffic, working conditions, youth, etc. from a European perspective. In the case of some supplementary studies, special youth and elderly samples have been drawn.

In the 2019 Eurobarometer survey, when people across Europe were asked to name the two most pressing issues confronting them personally, 18% mentioned health and social security, 15% pensions, 14% the environment, and 13% their own financial situation. Other economic and social issues followed, with crime (6%), immigration (5%), and terrorism (2%), in that order.

Flash Eurobarometer
The Flash Eurobarometer was introduced in the 1990s and consists of interviews, conducted by telephone, which are undertaken on an ad hoc basis. The main advantage of the Flash survey, as opposed to a normal Eurobarometer survey, is that it is much faster, providing results almost instantaneously. In addition, it is more suitable to the targeting of specific groups within the EU population.

Central and Eastern Eurobarometer
The Central and Eastern Eurobarometer series was carried out annually on behalf of the European Commission between 1990 and 1997. The CEEB surveys monitored economic and political changes, as well as attitudes towards Europe and the European Union, in up to 20 countries of the region.

Candidate Countries Eurobarometer
In 2001, the European Commission launched a series of surveys in the 13 countries that were applying for European Union membership under the title of "Candidate Countries Eurobarometer" (initially named "Applicant Countries Eurobarometer" or AC-EB). The CC-EB surveys were carried out in Bulgaria, Republic of Cyprus, Czech Republic, Estonia, Hungary, Latvia, Lithuania, Malta, Poland, Romania, Slovakia, Slovenia and Turkey. Since the EU enlargements of 2004 and 2007, the CC-EB countries that have become Member States have been included in the Standard Eurobarometer.

See also
Afrobarometer
European Social Survey
Latinobarómetro
World Values Survey

References

External links
 Website of the European Commission's Directorate-General Communication, providing public access to the official Eurobarometer reports 
 Data Archive services providing access to Eurobarometer primary data for re-use (statistical analysis) in social science research and training (GESIS)
 Cross-national survey programmes historical overview and links to resources (GESIS)

European Commission
Polling
Public opinion
Statistical data sets
Surveys (human research)